Father Brown, Detective  is a 1934 American mystery film directed by Edward Sedgwick and starring Walter Connolly, Paul Lukas and Gertrude Michael. It is based on the 1910 Father Brown story "The Blue Cross" by G. K. Chesterton.

Plot
When infamous jewel thief Flambeau (Paul Lukas) announces his intention to steal stones from a diamond cross in Father Brown (Walter Connolly)'s church, the crime-solving cleric fights to retain the cross, and also to save the soul of the elusive Flambeau.

Cast
 Walter Connolly as Father Brown
 Paul Lukas as Flambeau
 Gertrude Michael as Evelyn Fischer
 Robert Loraine as Inspector Valentine
 Halliwell Hobbes as Sir Leopold Fischer
 Una O'Connor as Mrs. Boggs
 E.E. Clive as Sergeant
 Donald Gray as  Don 
 Bunny Beatty as	Jenny
 Peter Hobbes as	Peter
 King Baggot as 	Priest 
 Douglas Gerrard as Constable 
 Robert Adair as Policeman 
 Gwenllian Gill as	Flowershop Girl
 Fred Walton as Waiter 
 Alyce Ardell as 	Maid

References

External links

1934 films
Adaptations of works by G. K. Chesterton
American mystery films
1930s English-language films
Films about Catholic priests
Films directed by Edward Sedgwick
Films set in England
American black-and-white films
1934 mystery films
1930s American films